Hassan Al-Harbi (born 13 December 1994) is a Saudi Arabian professional footballer who plays as a centre back for Al-Qadsiah.

Club career
Al-Harbi started his career in the youth team of Al-Shoulla in his hometown Al-Kharj. He was promoted to the first team in 2015 but made no senior appearances for the club. On 22 December 2015, Al-Harbi joined Hajer. He made his first-team debut on 17 November 2016 in the league match against Al-Jeel. He scored his first goal for the club on 18 March 2017 in the 2–2 draw against Al-Shoulla. On 20 June 2019, Al-Harbi Al-Ain on a free transfer. Al-Harbi helped Al-Ain get promoted to the Pro League for the first time in the club's history in his first season at the club. On 18 July 2022, Al-Harbi joined Al-Qadsiah on a free transfer.

References

External links
 

Living people
1994 births
Saudi Arabian footballers
Association football defenders
Al-Shoulla FC players
Hajer FC players
Al-Ain FC (Saudi Arabia) players
Al-Qadsiah FC players
Saudi First Division League players
Saudi Professional League players
People from Riyadh Province